Viktoria-Luise-Platz is a hexagonal place on Motzstraße in Schöneberg, Berlin. It was laid out in 1900. It is named after Princess Viktoria Luise of Prussia 1892 - 1980, the daughter of Kaiser Wilhelm II of Germany, and Great-Grand daughter of Queen Victoria.

Squares in Berlin